The M series, also known as M1, was the second series of rapid transit rolling stock used in the subway system of Toronto, Ontario, Canada. They were built by Montreal Locomotive Works in Montreal, Quebec, Canada, from 1961 to 1962. They were the first Toronto subway cars to be manufactured in Canada, and only one of two series built outside Ontario.

History
By 1960, the Toronto Transit Commission was preparing to expand its subway system to include the University line. The TTC wanted subway cars with a larger  design and also wished to expand upon some of the experimental features in the existing G-series cars. The new design was pushed forward by general manager John G. Inglis.

A total of only 36 M-series cars were built. As the subway expanded and more trains were necessary, the TTC turned to Hawker Siddeley to build the next series of subway cars.

Design
The TTC performed testing at St. Clair and Union stations with a 75-foot test vehicle known as the Duncan Dragon. Built at the Duncan Shops by Len Bardsley and the D&D Equipment Company, the test car consisted of two trucks with three panels and was designed to test the size of train that could successfully navigate the tunnels. A steel girder with railings allowed workers to walk and ride the car during tests.

After specifications for the new cars were finalized, Alco's Montreal Locomotive Works was contracted to build the new cars, dubbed "M1". The cars are historically notable as the first subway cars produced in Canada and, at the time of their construction, the longest subway cars in the world. All subsequent TTC cars have followed the size and length specifications of the M series (though the Toronto Rocket deviates from the two-car married-pair formation) and influenced several other transit authorities to examine the use of longer cars.

Retirement
The M1 trains were decommissioned on May 1, 1999, and scrapped soon afterwards. All were scrapped except cars 5300 & 5301, which were given to the Halton County Radial Railway museum for preservation.

See also
 Clearance car, special car to check for obstructions
 Toronto subway rolling stock

Notes

References

External links
 M–series cars

 

Toronto rapid transit passenger equipment
600 V DC multiple units
Electric multiple units of Canada